James Edward Cahill (15 April 1903 – 21 August 1978) was an Australian politician and a member of the New South Wales Legislative Assembly for one term from  1953 until 1956. He was also an indirectly elected  member of the New South Wales Legislative Council between 1965 and 1970. He was a member of the Labor Party (ALP).

Cahill was born in the farming community of Blackville near Quirindi, New South Wales and was the son of a schoolteacher. Cyril Cahill a member of the Legislative Council between 1961 and 1977, was his brother (but neither was related to ALP Premier Joe Cahill).

Educated at Tamworth High School, Jim Cahill qualified as a licensed pharmacist. He owned a chemist's shop in Armidale and became involved in community organisations including  Lions and the Chamber of Commerce. Having joined the local branch of the ALP in 1930, he served part-time in the Militia for five years.

After two unsuccessful attempts, Cahill was elected to the parliament as the Labor member for Armidale at the 1953 state election. He defeated the incumbent Country Party member Davis Hughes by 13 votes. Armidale was usually considered unwinnable for Labor but the result reflected the solid swing to the party at that election. Cahill held the seat for only one term but remained active in the Labor Party after his defeat in 1956. He was subsequently indirectly elected, on the party's nomination, to a seat in the Legislative council between 1965 and 1970. There he filled the casual vacancy which had been caused by the death of incumbent Michael Quinn. He did not hold  party, parliamentary or ministerial office.

References

 

1903 births
1978 deaths
Members of the New South Wales Legislative Assembly
Members of the New South Wales Legislative Council
Australian Labor Party members of the Parliament of New South Wales
20th-century Australian politicians
People from Armidale
Australian Army personnel
20th-century Australian military personnel
Military personnel from New South Wales